ND2 may refer to:
 China Railways ND2 diesel-electric locomotive
 MT-ND2, NADH dehydrogenase subunit 2
 Neutral density filter (ND) with an attenuation factor of 2
 North Dakota's 2nd congressional district